The first season of Workaholics debuted on Comedy Central on April 6, 2011 and concluded on June 8, 2011 with a total of 10 episodes.

Cast

Main
Blake Anderson as Blake Henderson
Adam DeVine as Adam DeMamp
Anders Holm as Anders "Ders" Holmvik
Jillian Bell as Jillian Belk
Maribeth Monroe as Alice Murphy

Recurring
Erik Griffin as Montez Walker
Kyle Newacheck as Karl Hevachek

Guest
Marc Summers as himself
Mel Rodriguez as Ryan
Clint Howard as Dean
Rance Howard as Jerry
Rebel Wilson as Big Money Hustla
Chris D'Elia as Topher
Laura Kightlinger as Sharon
Chris Parnell as Bruce Benson

Production
Prior to the series debut on April 6, 2011, "In the Line of Getting Fired", originally aired as a special sneak peek on March 15, 2011 immediately following the Comedy Central Roast of Donald Trump, and was never re-aired until its official debut on June 8, 2011 when it served as the season finale. That episode was watched in 1.36 million U.S. households but the ratings for the March 15 sneak peek were never released.

Episodes

Notes

References

External links
 
 

2011 American television seasons